Adrian Tiger Chirtea (born December 30, 1996) is an American singer and songwriter. He is half of the duo Take 2, along with his brother Julian Woodrow.

Biography
Chirtea is son of Heather Chirtea and Gordon Woodrow. He has a twin brother little more than 10 minutes, Julian Woodrow. Although twins have a different last name because since Adrian was younger he always went by his mother's last name and Julian by his father's.

Career
Adrian and his brother have been singing together since they were little and enjoy harmonizing with each other today. They formed a group, consisting of the two called Blackberry Jam. Under this name, they auditioned for the X-Factor in the fall of 2011 making a video of them singing the song, Hallelujah and that got them into X Factor's Boot Camp but were eliminated during the competition.

In 2012 they play small shows in their hometown in Vermont and post new covers on YouTube. They tried out for X-Factor again and their audition tape was their Payphone video (That can be found on their YouTube channel) which got them through the first 3 rounds. They also tried out for America's Got Talent and The Voice.

In 2013 they win a scholarship to the 2013 Prodigy Camp Project, a summer program that brings together 20 of the most promising teenage songwriters and filmmakers to hone their craft.

References

External links 

 

1996 births
Living people
Songwriters from Vermont
21st-century American singers
21st-century American male singers
American male songwriters